Kamal Haji-Kurbanovich Khan-Magomedov; born 17 June 1986 in Derbent, Dagestan, Russia) is a Russian judoka of Tabasaran and Azerbaijani descents.

Career
During his early career, he trained at Derbent Sports School No.3 under Sadiq Abdulov. Khan-Magomedov's introduction to the sport of judo was indirect, thinking it was karate: "In our city we did not know what judo was, we were thinking that it was karate, so we went to karate, but it was judo."

Khan-Magomedov won silver in -66 kg at the 2013 European Judo Championships after being defeated by 2012 Olympics Champion Lasha Shavdatuashvili of Georgia. He then won bronze in the -66 kg final category at the 2014 World Judo Championships.

Khan-Magomedov won gold in -66 kg at the inaugural 2015 European Games defeating Frenchman Loïc Korval in the finals held in Baku, Azerbaijan.

He plans to set up a business after completing his career.

References

External links
 
 

Tabasaran people
Russian male judoka
People from Derbent
1986 births
Living people
Russian sportspeople of Azerbaijani descent
Judoka at the 2015 European Games
European Games medalists in judo
European Games gold medalists for Russia
European Games bronze medalists for Russia
Universiade medalists in judo
Universiade silver medalists for Russia
Medalists at the 2009 Summer Universiade
Sportspeople from Dagestan
21st-century Russian people